Khurshida Moyejuddin is a Awami League politician and the former Member of Bangladesh Parliament of women's reserved seat.

Career
Moyejuddin was elected to parliament from women's reserved seat as an Awami League candidate in 1973.

References

Awami League politicians
Living people
1st Jatiya Sangsad members
Women members of the Jatiya Sangsad
Year of birth missing (living people)
20th-century Bangladeshi women politicians